Munmun Ahmed is a Bangladeshi film and television actress and dancer. She specializes in kathak dancing. Besides, she is a regular performer in radio plays for Bangladesh Betar.

Career
Ahmed was born on 27 December 1966. Her first instructor was Azhar Khan at Azimpur Ladies Club. She started taking kathak lessons from Syed Abul Kalam in 1978.

After completing her high school exams in 1987 she went to India. There she studied at the Ram Bharatia Kala Kendra under Ram Mohan Maharaj and Raj Kumar Sharma. In 1989, she became a student of Pandit Birju Maharaj in Delhi Kathak Kendra.

Ahmed runs a dance school, Rewaaz Performing School. She was the choreographer of the dance performance held in 2010 South Asian Games in Dhaka.

Popular films
Ghetuputra Komola(2012)
Amar Ache Jol(2008)
Golapi Ekhon Bilatey (2010)

Personal life
Ahmed is married to singer Sujit Mustafa. Together they have a daughter, Aporajita Mustafa.

Awards
 National Award by Bangladesh Shishu Academy for kathak dance (1980)
 UNESCO Cultural Award (2000)
 NHK Japan Award (2000)

References

External links

Living people
Kathak exponents
Bangladeshi female dancers
Bangladeshi television actresses
Bangladeshi film actresses
Bangladeshi choreographers
Year of birth missing (living people)